Jorge Luís (Portuguese) or Jorge Luis (Spanish) is a given name. Notable people with the name include:

Footballers
Jorge Luis Campos (born 1970), Paraguayan footballer
Jorge Luís dos Santos (born 1972), Brazilian footballer
Jorge Luís Andrade da Silva, (born 1975), Brazilian footballer
Jorge Luiz dos Santos Dias, (born 1976), Brazilian footballer
Jorge Luiz Pereira de Sousa, (born 1977), Brazilian footballer
Jorge Luiz Barbosa Teixeira, (born 1999), Brazilian footballer

Other
Jorge Luis Borges, (1899-1986), Argentine writer
Jorge Luis Sánchez, (born 1960), Cuban film director
Jorge Luis Gonzalez (born 1964), Cuban boxer
Jorge Luis Mancillas Ramírez Mexican jurist
Jorge Luis Ochoa Vázquez, Colombian drug trafficker

See also

Portuguese masculine given names